Jean-Baptiste Jodoin (July 14, 1809 – January 14, 1884) was a farmer and political figure in Quebec. He represented Chambly in the Legislative Assembly of Quebec from 1867 to 1871 as a Conservative.

He was born in Boucherville, Lower Canada, the son of Jean-Baptiste Jodoin and Céleste Quintal. Jodoin was married twice: to Gilette Viau in 1830 and to Marie-Louise Jodoin in 1866. He was mayor from 1862 to 1868. Jodoin died in Montreal at the age of 74.

References 
 

1809 births
1884 deaths
Conservative Party of Quebec MNAs
Mayors of places in Quebec
People from Boucherville